Tikhonyata is a rural locality (a village) in Leninskoye Rural Settlement, Kudymkarsky District, Perm Krai, Russia. The population was 15 as of 2010.

Geography 
Tikhonyata is located 42 km southeast of Kudymkar (the district's administrative centre) by road. Pyatina is the nearest rural locality.

References 

Rural localities in Kudymkarsky District